Regional elections were held in Aceh on 11 December 2006 after a peace agreement had been signed between the government of Indonesia and the Free Aceh Movement on 15 August 2005, ending the Insurgency in Aceh.

Candidates
There were eight pairs of candidates for the governor and deputy governor posts:

 Iskandar Hoesin and M. Saleh Manaf (PBB)
 Lieutenant-General (ret.) Tamlicha Ali and Tengku Harmen Nuriqmar (PBR, PPNUI, and PKB)
 Abdul Malik Raden and Sayed Fuad Zakaria (Golkar, PDI-P, and PKPI)
 Humam Hamid and Hasbi Abdullah (PPP)
 Djali Yusuf and R.A. Syauqas Rahmatillah (Independent)
 Irwandi Yusuf and Muhammad Nazar (Independent, supported by much of the Free Aceh Movement)
 Azwar Abubakar and Mohamad Nasir Djamil (PAN and PKS)
 Ghazali Abas Adan and Salahuddin Alfata (Independent)

Poll
A sample poll by the Indonesia Survey Institute showed former rebel leader Irwandi Yusuf leading on a turnout of 85%.

Yusuf: 39%
Hamid: 16%
Malik Raden: 14%
Abubakar: 11%
Abas Adan: 7%
Tamlicha: 4%

Results
Final results were made public on 29 December 2006:

 Irwandi Yusuf: 38.20%
 Humam Hamid: 16.62%
 Abdul Malik Raden: 13.97%

References

Bibliography
 Ben Hillman, 'Aceh's Rebels Turn to Ruling', Far Eastern Economic Review, Vol. 170, No. 1, January-February 2007, 49–53.

2006 Indonesian gubernatorial elections
Elections in Aceh
December 2006 events in Asia